Fine Food, Fine Pastries, Open 6 to 9 is a 1989 American short documentary film produced and directed by David Petersen.

Summary
Owners and waitresses of Sherrill's Restaurant and Bakery, a down-home gathering place behind the Capitol, observed Washington and its denizens since the Depression as the film captures moments during a typical day in the very un-Washington Capitol Hill hang out, conveying the role of the eatery in the neighborhood as patrons discuss local history and politics.

Accolades
It was nominated in 1989 for an Academy Award for Best Documentary Short. It also was a first place winner in the American, National Educational, and Houston Film Festivals; and won a CINE Golden Eagle and Emmy Award.

See also
Eateries
1989 in film
Diners

References

External links
, posted by David Petersen
Fine Food, Fine Pastries, Open 6 to 9 at Direct Cinema

Official website
MUBI

1989 films
1989 documentary films
1989 short films
American short documentary films
1980s short documentary films
American independent films
Documentary films about food and drink
1989 independent films
1980s English-language films
1980s American films